Crisis is an American action thriller drama television series that was aired on NBC from March 16 to June 22, 2014 as part of the 2013–14 United States network television schedule and the mid-season entry. The series was created by Rand Ravich for 20th Century Fox Television. The series stars Dermot Mulroney, Rachael Taylor, Lance Gross, James Lafferty, Max Martini, Michael Beach, Stevie Lynn Jones, Halston Sage, Max Schneider, Joshua Erenberg, and Gillian Anderson. Crisis premiered on March 16, 2014.

On May 9, 2014, midway through its first season, NBC canceled Crisis. The network broadcast the remaining episodes starting May 25, with the two-hour series finale airing on June 22.

Premise
During a school trip, students of Ballard High School, attended by the children of Washington, D.C.'s elite, including the President's son, are the victims of an ambush. A national crisis begins and Secret Service agent Marcus Finley finds himself at the center of it on his first day on the job. FBI agent Susie Dunn also discovers her "niece", the daughter of CEO Meg Fitch, is among the kidnapped children.

Cast

Main

 Dermot Mulroney as Francis Gibson, an ex-CIA analyst who was betrayed by the government
 Rachael Taylor as FBI Special Agent Susie Dunn
 Lance Gross as Secret Service Special Agent Marcus Finley, a rookie who was betrayed by his partner
 James Lafferty as Mr. Nash, teacher at Ballard High School
 Max Martini as Koz, a mercenary hired by Gibson
 Michael Beach as William Olsen, Director of the FBI
 Stevie Lynn Jones as Beth Ann Gibson, the daughter of Francis, with whom she has a strained relationship
 Halston Sage as Amber Fitch, Susie's biological daughter but raised by Meg as her own
 Max Schneider as Ian Martinez, Beth's best friend
 Gillian Anderson as Meg Fitch, the CEO of an international IT company and Susie's older sister

Recurring
 David Andrews as Secret Service Special Agent Hurst, head of the White House protective detail. He was working for Gibson under duress, until being shot and killed by Kyle DeVore, who believed that Hurst had betrayed him.
 John Allen Nelson as President DeVore
 David Chisum as Noah Fitch, husband of Meg Fitch
 Adam Scott Miller as Kyle DeVore, the president's teenage son
 Brandon Ruiter as Luke Putnam, one of the teenagers abducted and Kyle's friend
 Shavon Kirksey as Sloan Yarrow, another of the abducted teenagers and Amber's best friend
 Rammel Chan as Jin Liao, one of the teenagers who believes Kyle is the reason for everyone being kidnapped
 Jessica Dean Turner as Dutton, a Communications Gunwoman and Maryland State Police officer working for Gibson
 Mark Valley as Gabe Widener, Director of the CIA
 Rod Hallett as Dr. Jonas Clarenbach, a scientist who once worked in the pharmaceuticals division at Meg's company, and is also Meg's former lover
 Joshua Erenberg as Anton Roth, an advanced student from the school who is saved from the initial ambush by Agent Finley
 John Henry Canavan as Morgan Roth, a scientist and father to Anton Roth

Development and production
NBC bought Rand Ravich's script with a put pilot commitment in August 2012. In January 2013, NBC green-lit the production of a pilot episode. Scenes of Ballard High School were filmed at Northside College Prep in Chicago. On May 12, 2013, the series was placed on the network's 2013–14 schedule. It premiered on March 16, 2014.

On November 1, 2013, after filming was completed for the sixth episode, production of the series was put on an unscheduled, week-long hiatus. The pause in production was attributed to fears that subsequent episodes were veering too far away from the tone of the pilot, which received very positive early reviews. The break was supposed to be used to give writers time to re-work scripts and to re-shoot certain scenes for previously finished episodes. Filming later resumed.

Episodes

Reception

Critical reception
Crisis scored 63 out of 100 on Metacritic based on 28 "generally favorable" reviews. On Rotten Tomatoes, it was given a score of 61% based on 33 reviews, with an average rating of 6.8 out of 10.

Alessandra Stanley of The New York Times gave it a positive review. Stanley wrote: "The pilot is terrific" and suggested that the series could be a new "24" but that "a series centered on a busload of kidnapped students and their fate, dragged out week after week, could easily try viewers' patience."
Tim Goodman of The Hollywood Reporter gave it a negative review, calling it "as flat as any recent thriller on network television--actually more so. There’s barely an ounce of believability in it. The casting seems woeful and the acting isn’t going to get you to the second hour."

Ratings

References

External links
 
 

2014 American television series debuts
2010s American drama television series
2014 American television series endings
American action television series
English-language television shows
NBC original programming
Television series by 20th Century Fox Television
Television shows set in Chicago
Television shows set in Washington, D.C.
Television shows set in Maryland
Television shows set in Virginia
Terrorism in television
American thriller television series